The 2022 Ferratum World RX of Rīga-Latvia was the second and third round of the ninth season of the FIA World Rallycross Championship. The event was first double-header (two races in a weekend) of the season and held at Biķernieku Kompleksā Sporta Bāze, in the Latvian capital of Riga.

World RX1e Championship Race 1 

Source

Heats

Progression 

 Race 1

 Race 2

Semi-finals 

 Semi-Final 1

 Semi-Final 2

 Note: Gustav Bergström progressed to the Final race as one of two placed trird Semi-Finals drivers with better result in Progression Round.

Final

World RX1e Championship Race 2 

Source

Heats

Progression 

 Race 1

 Race 2

Semi-finals 

 Semi-Final 1

 Semi-Final 2

 Note: Ole Christian Veiby progressed to the Final race as one of two placed trird Semi-Finals drivers with better result in Progression Round.

Final

Standings after the event 

Source

 Note: Only the top five positions are included.

References 

|- style="text-align:center"
|width="35%"|Previous race:2022 World RX of Norway
|width="40%"|FIA World Rallycross Championship2022 season
|width="35%"|Next race:2022 World RX of Portugal
|- style="text-align:center"
|width="35%"|Previous race:2021 World RX of Latvia
|width="40%"|World RX of Latvia
|width="35%"|Next race:-
|- style="text-align:center"

Latvia
2022 in Latvian sport
World RX of Latvia